The Seleucid–Parthian wars were a series of conflicts between the Seleucid Empire and Parthia which resulted in the ultimate expulsion of the Seleucids from Iran and the establishment of the Parthian Empire. The wars were caused by Iranian tribes migrating into Central Asia and the inability of the Seleucids to properly defend or hold together their vast empire.

Background 
In 323 BC, the Seleucid Empire was founded by Seleucus I Nicator, a general of Alexander the Great. Stretching from Syria to the Indus River and comprising most of Alexander's realm, the Seleucid state was the most powerful of the Diadochi kingdoms that sprang up after Alexander's death. Quickly however, the Seleucids ran into trouble trying to maintain such an extended realm, facing constant warfare against the other Hellenistic states in the west and with unrest amongst their Iranian peoples in the east.

Taking advantage of the Seleucids' preoccupation with the wars against a Celtic invasion of Asia Minor in the west, and the chaos of the Third Syrian War around 245 BC, Diodotus and Andragoras, the Seleucid satraps of Bactria and Parthia respectively, declared their remote provinces independent states. However, in around 238, the Parni, an Iranian tribe from the central Asian steppes under Arsaces, invaded Andragoras' domain, defeated and killed him, and took over the land. The Parni then became known as the Parthians taking their name from the Seleucid province that they had conquered. They then began to try and conquer as much of the eastern Seleucid empire as possible, taking the city of Hekatompylos, by 238, which became their capital. They were joined in this by the now independent province of Bactria. The Seleucid king Seleucus II was at the time too busy fighting a war against Ptolemaic Egypt and so the Seleucids lost most of their territory east of Persia and Media.

Campaigns of Seleucus II Callinicus 
After the death of his father, Antiochus II, in 246 BC, Seleucus II succeeded him as ruler, but was unable to respond to the Parthian raids in the Eastern portion of the empire due to war with Ptolemaic Egypt and, subsequently, his younger brother, Hierax, who attempted to establish himself as the independent ruler of Asia Minor.  Eventually, the two brothers reached a truce and Seleucus was able to begin an expedition against the Parthians.  Despite achieving initial success, expelling the Parthians from Parthia and Hyrcania, Seleucus II was likely defeated and possibly captured by the Parthians, who were possibly aided by Diodotus II, the ruler of Bactria.  After his release, Seleucus returned to Asia Minor to once again deal with Hierax, who had resumed hostilities against his brother.

Campaigns of Antiochus III  
Antiochus III was an ambitious Seleucid king who had a vision of reuniting Alexander the Great's empire under the Seleucid dynasty. In 209 BC, he launched a campaign to regain control of the eastern provinces, and after defeating the Parthians in battle, he successfully regained control over the region. The Parthians were forced to accept vassal status and now only controlled the land conforming to the former Seleucid province of Parthia. However, Parthia's vassalage was only nominal at best and only because the Seleucid army was on their doorstep. For his retaking of the eastern provinces and establishing the Seleucid borders as far east as they had been under Seleucus I Nicator, Antiochus was awarded the title great by his nobles. Luckily for the Parthians, the Seleucid Empire had many enemies, and it was not long before Antiochus led his forces west to fight Ptolemaic Egypt and the rising Roman Republic.

Rise of the Arsacids and the end of the Seleucid Empire 
Seleucid power began to weaken after the defeat of Antiochus III at the hands of the Romans at the Battle of Magnesia which effectively broke Seleucid power and in particular the Seleucid army.  After this defeat, Antiochus began an expedition into Iran, but was killed in  Elymaïs. The Arsacids then took power in Parthia and declared their full independence from the Seleucid Empire. In 148 BC, the Parthian king Mithridates I invaded Media which was already in revolt against the Seleucid empire, and in 141 BC the Parthians captured the major Seleucid city of Seleucia (which was the eastern capital of the Seleucid empire).  These victories gave Mithridates control over Mesopotamia and Babylonia. In 139 BC the Parthians defeated a major Seleucid counterattack, breaking the Seleucid army, and captured the Seleucid King, Demetrius II, thus effectively ending Seleucid claims to any land east of the Euphrates river.   In order to recover this territory, Antiochus VII Sidetes, launched a counter-offensive against the Parthians in 130 BC, initially defeating them twice in battle.  The Parthians sent a delegation to negotiate a peace agreement, but ultimately rejected the terms proposed by Antiochus.  The Seleucid army was then dispersed into winter quarters.  Seeing an opportunity to strike,  the Parthians, under Phraates II, defeated and killed Antiochus at the Battle of Ecbatana in 129 BC, and proceeded to destroy and capture the rest of his massive army, thus ending the Seleucids' attempt to retake Persia.

The loss of so much territory sent the already enfeebled empire into a decline from which it could never recover. The Seleucid Empire became a rump state which consisted of little more than Antioch and the surrounding lands. The only reason the Seleucid Empire continued to exist is because the Parthians saw it as a useful buffer against the Roman Empire. When Pompey led a Roman expedition into Syria, he annexed the Seleucid Empire, and the stage was set for the Roman–Parthian Wars.

Legacy 
The westward expansion of Parthia during the war would eventually lead to clashes with the Roman Empire. The Roman–Parthian Wars would embroil these ancient empires until the 3rd century.

References

Wars involving the Seleucid Empire
Wars involving the Parthian Empire